The Spronser Rötelspitze is a mountain in the Ötztal Alps in South Tyrol, Italy.

References

External links 
 Alpenverein South Tyrol 

Mountains of the Alps
Mountains of South Tyrol
Ötztal Alps